Grange is a small village and townland in west County Waterford, Ireland. It borders Ardmore and An Seanphobal. Ardmore and Grange are two villages that make up the Ardmore-Grange parish.

Amenities 

The village lies on the N25 road, and consists of an 1835 Roman Catholic Church and a National School: St. Mary's, two shops, Glanbia and the local shop: Michael O'Brien's, and a pub (Flemings Bar). It is growing steadily, conveniently situated between the towns of Youghal to the west, and Dungarvan to the north-east.

Sport
Stage 2 of the 1998 Tour de France passed through Grange.

See also
 List of towns and villages in Ireland

References

Towns and villages in County Waterford
Townlands of County Waterford